Rubén de la Red Gutiérrez (born 5 June 1985) is a Spanish football manager and former central midfielder.

He made a name for himself at Getafe after emerging through Real Madrid's La Fábrica. Returning to his first club in 2008, he suffered a serious heart ailment which put his career on hold for two years, until he retired in late 2010.

De la Red was part of Spain's squad at the victorious Euro 2008 tournament.

Club career

Real Madrid
Born in Móstoles, Community of Madrid, de la Red arrived at the Real Madrid youth system when he was 14. At one point he was transferred to CD Móstoles after being told he was not good enough, but was soon re-signed by Madrid; after his fourth season youth coach Quique Sánchez Flores, who was moving to Getafe CF, wanted the player to join him at his new club, but Madrid turned him down.

De la Red made his first-team debut on 10 November 2004, in a 2–1 away win against CD Tenerife for the Copa del Rey. His first La Liga appearance came on 22 September 2005, playing two minutes in a 3–1 home triumph over Athletic Bilbao, and he appeared in two more games as a late substitute during that campaign.

In 2006–07, de la Red was called up to the main squad by manager Fabio Capello along with teammates Miguel Torres and Miguel Ángel Nieto, and made seven appearances during the league-winning season. On 9 November 2006 he scored his first goal with the main squad, closing the scoresheet against Écija Balompié for the domestic cup (5–1 home win, 6–2 aggregate); in July 2007, he renewed his contract until 2011.

Getafe
On 31 August 2007, de la Red was transferred to Madrid-based Getafe, with Real Madrid having an option to re-buy the next two years. There, he established himself as an important player, usually assuming the role of playmaker and being joined at the team by another Real Madrid canterano, Esteban Granero, who arrived on loan.

During the season, de la Red was forced due to injuries to teammates to perform as centre back, notably in the UEFA Cup quarter-final tie against FC Bayern Munich, in which second leg he was sent off in the sixth minute; in the continental competition he netted three times in 11 matches, notably in a 2–1 win at Tottenham Hotspur on 25 October 2007, equalizing after a set piece combination with Granero.

Return to Real Madrid and retirement
Real Madrid president Ramón Calderón confirmed in May 2008 that, along with Granero and Javi García, de la Red would return to the Santiago Bernabéu for 2008–09. It was suggested that the latter could be used in a swap deal involving a number of potential targets, although coach Bernd Schuster stated that he would be willing to give the midfielder a chance to fight for a spot in the squad.

On 24 August 2008 De la Red scored his first goal for the club since returning, netting an astounding long-range effort in the second leg of the Supercopa de España against Valencia CF. De la Red would go on to score his first goal for Real in league play less than a month later on 21 September, scoring in Real's 2–0 away win against Racing de Santander.

On 30 October 2008, de la Red was hospitalized after fainting during a Spanish Cup game against Real Unión. On 12 December, the club announced the player would miss the rest of the season as a precaution, and subsequent media reports claimed he may never recover from his heart condition.

Spanish national daily sports newspaper Marca reported on 30 June 2009 that after new tests had been inconclusive, De la Red's heart condition would force him to sit out the entire 2009–10 season and he'd be subjected to further evaluations every two months to reassess his health. The club officially announced the news on 2 July 2009, on the same day that new arrival Raúl Albiol was announced and given De la Red's former number 18 shirt, vowing to return it to him if he were to ever return.

In January 2010, several Madrid-based media reported Real Madrid were looking to declare de la Red's heart problem to be "a common condition" in order to trigger an annulment clause in his contract. This would have meant the player would only receive a €1,500-monthly disability benefit, rather than the full wages due from the remaining two years of his professional contract.

On 3 November 2010, de la Red announced his retirement from football at only 25. Prior to this announcement, he stated he would remain at the club as a youth coach.

Then-Director of football Jorge Valdano – also a former club player and coach – added: "This day marks a turning point in Rubén's life. He ends his career as a player to focus all his passion for this sport on training. He is, from today, a part of Real Madrid's coaching staff and will start learning about what we do and how we come about it. He will also be part of Mourinho's 'lab', in which every game is rigorously prepared. The objective is for Rubén to learn skills in order to apply them to whatever team he ends up being assigned to. He's gone through all of the different teams the club has and he will use that experience to continue to be a part of the world of football".

Return to Getafe
On 20 October 2015, de la Red was appointed manager of Getafe's reserves in the third tier. The team were relegated in his first season, and he left shortly afterwards.

Involvement in forgery and fraud
Ruben de la Red was fired from Real Madrid in June 2015 for forging documents and making false representations on behalf of Real Madrid in Oman and Tanzania. Manuel Parreno was also terminated, other people were involved including Emilio Butragueno and an external person named Rayco Garcia Cabrera who forged documents and falsely claimed that he was in charge of Real Madrid's international affairs department.  As a result of the forgery and misrepresentations, Real Madrid was obligated to pay over EUR 1m in damages to an Omani company after the Omani Supreme Court issued its final ruling. Real Madrid and the press named Rayco Garcia Cabrera as the main person behind these crimes.

International career
De la Red played for Spain under-21s before being called up by the senior team for a friendly with Italy on 26 March 2008, but did not make his debut. Uncapped, he was named in the nation's squad of 23 for UEFA Euro 2008 by coach Luis Aragonés, but would appear in two exhibition games against Peru and the United States prior to the continental competition.

During the tournament's final group stage match, de la Red scored his only international goal with a powerful strike against Greece on 18 June, for a 2–1 win.

Career statistics

Club

International goals

Managerial statistics

Honours
Real Madrid
La Liga: 2006–07
Supercopa de España: 2008

Getafe
Copa del Rey: Runner-up 2007–08
Spain
UEFA European Championship: 2008

Spain U19
UEFA European Under-19 Championship : 2004

References

External links
 
 
 

1985 births
Living people
People from Móstoles
Spanish footballers
Footballers from the Community of Madrid
Association football midfielders
La Liga players
Segunda División players
Segunda División B players
Real Madrid Castilla footballers
Real Madrid CF players
Getafe CF footballers
Spain youth international footballers
Spain under-21 international footballers
Spain international footballers
UEFA Euro 2008 players
UEFA European Championship-winning players
Spanish football managers
Segunda División B managers